Leptolaena gautieri is a species of flowering plant in the Sarcolaenaceae family. It is found only in Madagascar.

Description
Leptolaena gautieri is a small to medium-sized evergreen tree, growing from 3 to 5 meters tall. It flowers in July and August.

Range and habitat
Leptolaena gautieri is native to eastern Madagascar and to the Sambirano region of northwestern Madagascar.

Its natural habitat is mid-elevation moist lowland forest and montane subhumid forest from 300 to 1,480 meters elevation.

It is threatened by habitat loss.

References

gautieri
Endemic flora of Madagascar
Flora of the Madagascar lowland forests
Flora of the Madagascar subhumid forests
Least concern plants
Taxonomy articles created by Polbot